Szerencsejáték Zrt. is the largest gambling service provider in Hungary. The company was founded in 1991 and is 100% state owned (through Magyar Nemzeti Vagyonkezelő Zrt.). It has exclusive rights to distribute number draw games, sports bets and prize draw tickets throughout the entire territory of the country and - through its investments - it also has interests in four Hungarian casinos. It operates seven number draw games, such as five-number draw lottery, six-number draw lottery, Scandinavian Lotto, Joker, Keno, Luxor, and Puttó; three types of sports bets, including Toto Pools, Tippmix, and Goal Toto; and a portfolio of prize draw tickets. Szerencsejatek’s products are available by phone, Internet, and via SMS.

The website of Szerencsejáték Zrt. is not available in English. However, expats, temporary residents, tourists can purchase lottery tickets in person at the betting shops, and even online, if they get a so called "játékoskártya" (player card), which they can use in leu of a Hungarian ID card. You can get the player card at the betting shops, in person (brief registration required, ID or passport and proof of address are needed).

Notes

Gambling in Hungary
Hungarian brands